Dennis Crompton (12 March 1942 – 28 July 2015) was an English professional footballer who played as a wing half.

Born in Bolton, Crompton played for Wigan Athletic, Bolton Wanderers, Doncaster Rovers and Altrincham.

He died on 28 July 2015 after a long illness, aged 73.

References

External links
 
 

1942 births
2015 deaths
English footballers
Footballers from Bolton
Wigan Athletic F.C. players
Bolton Wanderers F.C. players
Doncaster Rovers F.C. players
Altrincham F.C. players
English Football League players
Association football wing halves